PictureTel Corporation, often shortened to PictureTel Corp., was one of the first commercial videoconferencing product companies. It achieved peak revenues of over $490 million in 1996 and 1997 and was eventually acquired by Polycom in October 2001.

History
PictureTel was founded in August 1984 as PicTel by MIT students Brian L Hinman, Jeffrey G. Bernstein and MIT Professor David H. Staelin.  The team was also assisted initially by MIT Professor Michael Dertouzos and two of his grad students Greg Papadopoulos and Richard Soley.

While at MIT Hinman and Bernstein were motivated by the video compression work by UC Davis Professor Anil K. Jain (1946–1988) and his colleague Jaswani R. Jain who published an important research paper combining block-based motion compensation and transform coding in December 1981. The result was PictureTel, creating one of the first real-time systems to implement motion compensation and transform coding in July 1986.

PictureTel was funded as "PicTel" by an initial public offering in November 1984, becoming a public company on virtually its first day of business. Product development started at this point. Its name was changed to PictureTel in 1987, due to concern about potential name conflict with another communications company, Pacific Telephone Co., also known as PacTel. While the company demonstrated its first product in 1986, the company did not have meaningful product sales until 1987.

PictureTel's first product, the C-2000 codec (compressor/decompressor) was the first commercial implementation of this computationally intensive technology. By analyzing the motion between successive frames rather than treating the frames as a sequence of unrelated images, this algorithm was significantly more data-efficient (required the transmission of much less data) than existing techniques. Requiring less data also meant that it was compatible with emerging dial-up data networks such as ISDN, making its use less expensive and more flexible than the leased, fixed-location lines normally used for high-speed data transmission at the time.

Subsequently, most of the video compression standards for two-way communications and video broadcast applications have been based upon motion compensation and transform coding, including those most widely used today such as H.264/MPEG-4 AVC.  PictureTel played a strong role in developing the industry standards for video, audio, and data communications, and released much of its technology for use free of charge.

In October 2001, PictureTel was purchased by Polycom, a company that was co-founded in 1990 by Brian Hinman and another early PictureTel employee, Jeffrey Rodman. Hinman and Bernstein would later be instrumental in creating 2Wire.

See also
 Ascend Communications
 Bonding protocol
 Compression Labs Inc.
 International Multimedia Telecommunications Consortium

References

Bibliography

External links
 MIT & PictureTel
 CNET
 PictureTel 900 Series
 
 
 
 

Videotelephony